The 5th Lo Nuestro Awards ceremony, presented by the Univision and Billboard magazine, honored the best Latin music of 1992 and 1993 and took place on May 20, 1993, at a live presentation held at the James L. Knight Center in Miami, Florida. The ceremony was broadcast in the United States and Latin America by Univision.

During the ceremony, twenty categories were presented. Winners were announced at the live event and included Cuban-American singer Jon Secada and Tejano performer Selena, each receiving three awards, and Juan Luis Guerra y 440, La Mafia and Jerry Rivera, each receiving two awards. Among its honors, Secada won the award for "Pop Album of the Year," La Mafia and Selena shared the award for "Regional Mexican Album of the Year," and Rivera won the award for "Tropical/Salsa Album of the Year." Mexican singer-songwriter Armando Manzanero received the Excellence Award.

Background 
In 1989, the Lo Nuestro Awards were established by Univision, to recognize the most talented performers of Latin music. The nominees were selected by Univision and Billboard magazine, and the winners chosen by the public. The categories included are for the Pop, Tropical/Salsa, Regional Mexican and Rap genres, and Music Video. The trophy awarded is shaped like a treble clef. The 5th Lo Nuestro Awards ceremony was held on May 20, 1993, in a live presentation held at the James L. Knight Center in Miami, Florida. The ceremony was broadcast in United States and Latin America by Univision.

Nominees and winners 

Winners were announced before the live audience during the ceremony. Cuban singer Jon Secada was the most nominated performer, with five nominations, including Pop Album (Jon Secada), Male Artist, New Artist, Pop Song ("Angel"), and Video of the Year ("Otro Día Más Sin Verte"). Secada was awarded in the first three categories, with Mexican singer Luis Miguel winning for Pop Song for the single "No Sé Tú", and Spanish band Mecano receiving the accolade for Video of the Year for "Una Rosa es Una Rosa". All the songs nominated for Pop Song of the Year, Secada's "Angel", "El Centro de Mi Corazón" by Chayanne, "Castillo Azul" by Ricardo Montaner, "Evidencias" by Ana Gabriel, and Miguel's "No Sé Tú", reached number-one at the Billboard Top Latin Songs chart. Tejano performer Selena dominated the Regional Mexican field winning all her nominations, including Album of the Year (Entre a Mi Mundo), Regional Mexican Song ("Como La Flor") and Female Artist. Jerry Rivera and Juan Luis Guerra y 440 were awarded two prizes at the Tropical/Salsa field, Rivera for his album Cuenta Conmigo and Male Artist of the Year, and Guerra y 440 earning the awards for Song ("El Costo de la Vida") and Group of the Year.

Honorary awards
Excellence Award: Armando Manzanero.

See also
1992 in Latin music
1993 in Latin music
Grammy Award for Best Latin Pop Album

References

1993 music awards
Lo Nuestro Awards by year
1993 in Florida
1993 in Latin music
1990s in Miami